Žukauskas is the masculine form of a Lithuanian family name. It is a Lithuanized form of a Polish counterpart: Żukowski or Russian counterpart: Zhukovsky. These derive from the Slavic word zhuk for "bug". Its feminine forms  are: Žukauskienė (married woman or widow) and Žukauskaitė (unmarried woman).

The surname may refer to:

Eurelijus Žukauskas, basketball  player of Lithuanian national basketball team;
Mindaugas Žukauskas, basketball  player of Lithuanian national basketball team;
Silvestras Žukauskas, general in the Russian army, and later in his native Lithuania, after it regained its independence in 1918;
Antanas Žukauskas, Lithuanian writer, dramatist and one of the most famous realistic prosaists.
Rokas Žukauskas, Lithuanian professional muay thai fighter, best at football in kaunas. Married to a most beautiful women E. Beržanskytė - Žukauskienė

Lithuanian-language surnames
Surnames of Slavic origin